The East Reserve was a block settlement in Manitoba set aside by the Government of Canada exclusively for settlement by Russian Mennonite settlers in 1873 (although settlement did not occur until 1874). Most of the East Reserve's earliest settlers were from the Kleine Gemeinde or Bergthaler Mennonite churches.

After signing Treaty 1 with the Anishinabe and Swampy Cree First Nations in 1871, the Canadian government sent William Hespeler to Russia to recruit Mennonite farmers to the region. The first Mennonites to visit the area in 1872 were Bernhard Warkentin and Jacob Yost Shantz, a Swiss Mennonite from Ontario, who wrote a Narrative of a journey to Manitoba, a report which helped convince Russian Mennonites to move to the area. In 1873 twelve Mennonite delegates from the Russian Empire, toured Manitoba and Kansas. The group looked at various locations in Manitoba, including the western part of the province, but chose the East Reserve because of its proximity to Winnipeg. Despite inferior farming land compared to Kansas, four delegates, representing the Bergthaler and Kleine Gemeinde churches, decided to recommend their people move to Manitoba because of the guarantees offered by the Canadian government. David Klassen, Jacob Peters, Heinrich Wiebe, and Cornelius Toews signed what they called a Privilegium, or agreement, with the Canadian government outlining religious freedom, military exemption, and land. This land became known as the East Reserve, because it was east of the Red River. 

In 1874 Mennonite settlers first arrived in the confluence of the Red River and Rat River and gathered in immigration sheds that Shantz had set up nearby before spreading across the region and selecting numerous village sites. In the years that followed, thousands of Mennonites settled in this area. The East Reserve was initially set aside exclusively for Mennonite settlement and settlers established dozens of villages, a few of which remain today, including Steinbach, now an independent municipality, Grunthal, Kleefeld, and Blumenort. The reserve was governed using the system the Mennonites had learned in Prussia. Each village had a Schulz, or mayor, while the whole reserve had an Oberschulz. Delegate Jacob Peters of Vollwerk (now part of Mitchell, Manitoba) was the first oberschulz. 

The first village settled was Gruenfeld, now Kleefeld, though most of the other villages were settled within months. As the home of the Bergthaler Bishop Gerhard Wiebe, the village of Chortitz quickly became the centre for trade and local government and an unofficial "capital" of the East Reserve, though over time the Kleine Gemeinde village of Steinbach overtook Chortitz in prominence. East Reserve Bergthalers adopted the named Chortitzer Mennonite Conference in 1878.

Briefly known as "The Mennonite Reserve" the name was quickly changed to "East Reserve" after a second reserve was established. The land of East Reserve was viewed by many as limited and unsuitable for farming, so a second larger reserve, called the West Reserve on the west side of the Red River was established in 1876. A smaller Scratching River settlement was also established in 1875 on the Morris River.

In 1877, Lord Dufferin visited the Mennonite villages of the East Reserve and, from a rise just west of Steinbach could see "half a dozen villages" in the distance. Lord Dufferin was greeted by Oberschulz Jacob Peters along with more than a 1000 local residents who showed up to greet him.

The East Reserve eventually opened up to settlement from other groups and became known as the Rural Municipality of Hanover. In 1880, the Manitoba government renamed the East Reserve as Hespeler and a year later, in 1881, the reserve was divided between the R.M. of Hespeler, no longer in existence, and the Rural Municipality of Hanover, which is slightly larger than the original East Reserve.

Rather than using open field farming, Mennonites lived in street villages called Strassendorfs, and built housebarns, none of which are extant and in situ in the East Reserve, though two original examples can be seen at the Mennonite Heritage Village in Steinbach. Beginning in 1909, the villages began to be disbanded in favour of open-field farming and by the 1920s no traditional Strassendorfs were left in the region, with some dissolving completely and others, such as Steinbach, evolving into modern communities.  Almost 150 years later, the area still retains a significant presence of Mennonites to this day.

References

Kleine Gemeinde
Russian Mennonite diaspora in Manitoba
History of Manitoba